Newhall may refer to:


Places

in England 
Newhall, Cheshire
Newhall, Derbyshire
Newhall, Essex, an area within Harlow
Newhall, South Yorkshire, an area within Sheffield

in the United States 
 Newhall, Santa Clarita, California, a district of Santa Clarita that was formerly independent
 Newhall, Iowa
 Newhall, Washington, a former town on Orcas Island
 Newhall, alternate name of the Highwood neighborhood in Hamden, Connecticut, adjacent to the Newhallville neighborhood in New Haven

People
 Christopher G. Newhall, volcanologist
 George Newhall, namesake of the Newhallville neighborhood of New Haven, Connecticut
 George H. Newhall, thirty-fifth mayor of Lynn, Massachusetts
Georgina Fraser Newhall (1860s-?), Canadian writer, stenographer
Henry Newhall
William Newhall

See also
 New Hall (disambiguation)